In algebraic geometry, a Severi variety, named after Francesco Severi, may be:

 a Brauer–Severi variety
 A Severi variety, a variety contained in a Hilbert scheme that parametrizes curves in projective space with given degree, arithmetic genus, and number of nodes and no other singularities.
 a Scorza variety  of dimension n in projective space of dimension 3n/2 + 2 that can be isomorphically projected to a hyperplane.